In mathematics, a reflection formula or reflection relation for a function f is a relationship between f(a − x) and f(x).  It is a special case of a functional equation, and it is very common in the literature to use the term "functional equation" when "reflection formula" is meant.

Reflection formulas are useful for numerical computation of special functions. In effect, an approximation that has greater accuracy or only converges on one side of a reflection point (typically in the positive half of the complex plane) can be employed for all arguments.

Known formulae 
The even and odd functions satisfy by definition simple reflection relations around a = 0. For all even functions,

and for all odd functions,

A famous relationship is Euler's reflection formula

for the gamma function , due to Leonhard Euler.

There is also a reflection formula for the general n-th order polygamma function ψ(n)(z),

The Riemann zeta function ζ(z) satisfies

and the Riemann Xi function ξ(z) satisfies

References
 
 

Calculus